Verdun Collège Français were a junior ice hockey team from Verdun, Quebec, Canada. They were members of the Quebec Major Junior Hockey League from 1991 to 1994. Collège Français resurrected the dormant Quebec Remparts franchise in 1985 after a three-year hiatus, as Longueuil Collège Français. The team played in Longueuil, Quebec at Colisée Jean Béliveau for three seasons  before moving to the Verdun Auditorium.

Led by coach Claude Therien, Verdun finished the 1991–92 regular season first overall winning the Jean Rougeau Trophy with 101 points. Collège Français won all three playoff rounds en route to capturing the President's Cup as league playoff champions. Verdun represented the QMJHL at the 1992 Memorial Cup, finishing fourth place.

The franchise ceased operations after the 1993–94 QMJHL season, and the Collège Français transferred its sponsorship and some management to the Laval Titan. The team's players were assigned to other QMJHL clubs by a dispersal draft. The expansion Halifax Mooseheads claimed top prospect Jean-Sébastien Giguère from the defunct Verdun team.

NHL alumni
Longueuil (1988–1991)
 Joel Bouchard, Donald Brashear, Philippe DeRouville, Karl Dykhuis

Verdun (1991–1994)
 Matthew Barnaby, Joel Bouchard, Donald Brashear, Jonathan Delisle, Philippe DeRouville, Yanick Dupre, Karl Dykhuis, Jean-Sébastien Giguère, Daniel Guérard, Christian Laflamme, Marc Rodgers, Jean-Guy Trudel

External links
 NHL alumni (Longueuil)
 Season results (Longueuil)
 NHL alumni (Verdun)
 Season results (Verdun)

Defunct Quebec Major Junior Hockey League teams
Verdun, Quebec
Ice hockey clubs established in 1991
Sports clubs disestablished in 1994
1991 establishments in Quebec
1994 disestablishments in Quebec